Xerophyllum is a genus of pygmy grasshoppers in the family Tetrigidae. There are at least two described species in Xerophyllum.

Species
These two species belong to the genus Xerophyllum:
 Xerophyllum cortices Buckton, 1903
 Xerophyllum platycorys (Westwood, 1839)

References

Further reading

 

Tetrigidae